Ruben Karlenovich Vardanyan (born 25 May 1968) is an Armenian and Artsakhi politician who served as the State Minister of Artsakh, an unrecognized state in the South Caucasus, from 4 November 2022 until 23 February 2023. Vardanyan continues to work in Artsakh following his dismissal from the post of State Minister. Prior to his political career, Vardanyan was a businessman and philanthropist. He is the former chief executive officer and shareholder of the Troika Dialog investment bank.

Early life and education 
Ruben Vardanyan was born on 25 May 1968, in Yerevan, Armenia. In 1985 he graduated with honours from Yerevan School No. 35. In 1985, he enrolled in Moscow State University's Faculty of Economics, located in Russia. After completing his first year, he did military service in Soviet Azerbaijan and Armenia. In 1992 he graduated with honours from the Faculty of Economics.

Vardanyan was trained at Cassa di Risparmio di Torino Italian savings bank in Turin and completed a course on developing markets at Merrill Lynch in New York in 1992. Later, he completed short-term courses at INSEAD (Fontainebleau, France, 2000), Harvard Business School (2001, 2005, 2018), Yale University and Stanford GSB (2012, 2013).

Career

Troika Dialog 

Vardanyan and Peter Derby founded Troika Dialog on 18 March 1991. Vardanyan first worked as an expert and then headed the IPO department. In 1992, Vardanyan entered the executive board and became an executive director. Later he became the president, CEO, and chairman of the board of directors of the company. He held the post until the company was sold. In the early 2000s, Troika had offices in New York and London. As of 2011, the partners held 63.6% of Troika Dialog shares, with 40% owned by Vardanyan. At financial year-end 2010, Troika’s assets totaled $5.75 bln, $872 mln equity and $42.346 mln revenue. On March 11, 2011, Sberbank announced its 100% acquisition of Troika Dialog for $1 bln, the transaction was finalized on January 23, 2012. The agreement also included Troika's partners’ bonuses for three years, thus the overall deal totaled $1.4 bln. Before the sale, Vardanyan owned the major block of shares (40%), estimated at $560 mln. In requital, he was offered a 20.5% stake in AvtoVAZ and a 27.3% stake in Kamaz, later sold with a profit.

The merger resulted in the launch of Sberbank CIB, Sberbank’s corporate and investment banking business. From the sale of "Troika Dialog" until 2015, Vardanyan co-headed Sberbank CIB, also holding posts of adviser to the CEO of Sberbank and chairman of the board.

By 2013, Forbes estimated Vardanyan's net worth at $800 mln.

On 4 March 2019, the Organized Crime and Corruption Reporting Project (OCCRP) published an investigation on the Troika Laundromat, reporting on its network of 76 offshore companies, facilitating around $4.6 bln. Later Vardanyan commented on the investigation, stating that the company "always strived to perform only under the strict principles of legitimacy and transparency". Austrian prosecution service found no grounds to open an official investigation on the offshore network of Troika Dialog.

Investment projects after Troika 
In 2013 Vardanyan along with Mikhail Broitman started Vardanyan, Broitman and Co, an investment company. As of  2018, Vardanyan owned 75% of the company. Its assets include shares in Ameriabank, UFS Transport operator, and several venture projects (Lamoda, Pronutria, NtechLab). Major investments are placed in real estate management. In 2013 Vardanyan acquired a 50% share in Avica Management Company, an investment fund, established by Gagik Adibekyan's RD Group. In February 2018 the partners announced a split, dividing real estate assets of estimated $1 bln value. Accprding to the settlement, Vardanyan was to keep office spaces, including Romanov Dvor and Vozdvizhenka business centres. Also in 2018 Vardanyan and Global Blue announced the launch of Global Blue Russia, a first tax-refunding company in Russia.

In 2015 Ruben Vardanyan launched "Phoenix Advisors", a company engaged in family welfare protection, management and succession planning.

In 2020, the Anti-Corruption Foundation, a Russian NGO led by Russian opposition figure Alexey Navalny, published an investigation which concerned Santerna Holdings Limited, a company owned by Vardanyan. Citing Santerna's publicly available annual reports, the investigation found that, in 2016, Santerna invested almost $33.45 million in Luchano, a spa business owned by Gulsina Minnikhanova, the wife of the President of Tatarstan Rustam Minnikhanov. The annual reports showed that Santerna's auditors applied a $26.8 million impairment charge shortly after the investment, reducing Santerna's stake in Luchano to $6.6 million. In 2018, Santerna made another investment of $10 million in Luchano. Months later, the same auditors applied another impairment charge, further bringing down the value of Santerna's investment, to $5 million. Based on this financial activity, whereby Santerna willingly overpaid twice, the Anti-Corruption Foundation asserted that Vardanyan's company made two disguised gifts, or bribes, to the wife of the President of Tatarstan. In the aftermath of both investments, investigative journalists found millions of dollars of luxury real estate owned by Minnikhanov's family. Vardanyan denied these accusations.

Executive posts 
In 2004 Vardanyan was CEO of Rosgosstrakh. He also headed Troika Dialog at the same time. As of October 2019, Vardanyan is one of the members of board of directors at Kamaz, Ameriabank and Global Blue Russia Holdings B.V. He also is a member of the investment committee Avica Property Investors International, a member of the supervisory board at Investment and Venture Fund of the Republic of Tatarstan. Vardanyan is the chairman of the editorial committee international at BRICS Business Magazine. He previously had served as an expert and executive member of advisory boards at Sollers JSC, AvtoVAZ, Sibur, Novatek, Sukhoi Civil Aircraft Company, Sheremetyevo International Airport, Rosgosstrakh, International Finance Corporation, Standard Bank, Marsh & McLennan Companies, Russian Trading System, Moscow Stock Exchange, the Federal Commission on Securities Market, the Depository Clearing Company, the National Association of Stock Market participants etc. He also headed the National Association of Stock Market participants during 1997 and 1998. Since 2000, Vardanyan has been a member of the Russian Union of Industrialists and Entrepreneurs (RSPP) where he was one of the members of executive board till 2012. In 2009 he entered the Committee on Innovative Policy and Entrepreneurship. Vardanyan was one of the co-founders of the 2015 Club, an informal Russian businessmen organization, that worked on strategic planning for the Russian economy up to 2015. Since 2010 Vardanyan is a member of trustees at the Alexander Gorchakov Public Diplomacy Fund. In 2015 he co-founded the Primakov Center for International Cooperation, currently Vardanyan is a member of its advisory board. In 2019, Vardanyan was invited to join the executive board of Moscow-based ACRA rating agency.

Following the 2022 Russian invasion of Ukraine, Vardanyan was placed on the Ukrainian government’s list of sanctioned people for his role as a board member of the Russian air cargo company Volga Dnepr, which plays a major role in Russian military air transport.

Move to Armenia and the Republic of Artsakh 
In June 2021, Vardanyan acquired Armenian citizenship. He stated that he made his decision to move back to Armenia following the 2020 Nagorno-Karabakh war. In the past, Vardanyan denied any intention to take up any government position in Armenia; however, he was viewed as a potential political player and is rumored to be involved with the newly founded political party Country of Living. In November 2021, Vardanyan gave an interview in which he spoke about plans to start a political career in Armenia, and also considered the possibility of becoming the president of Armenia. In September 2022, Vardanyan declared that he was moving to the unrecognized Republic of Artsakh (in the disputed region of Nagorno-Karabakh) and announced that he was no longer a Russian citizen. Following Russia's 2022 invasion of Ukraine, Vardanyan was named in a draft bill in the U.S. House of Representatives which called for him to be targeted for individual sanctions. Vardanyan denies that his renunciation of Russian citizenship is an attempt to escape international sanctions against Russia. In his words, his actions stem from a desire to be with his nation during a time of crisis: “Today the people of Artsakh are in a very difficult psychological state, they have no confidence in the future. The inhabitants of the republic, who survived two wars and lost their loved ones in the struggle for independence, feel abandoned,” he stated. In October 2022, Vardanyan was publicly offered the position of State Minister with "broad powers" by President of Artsakh Arayik Harutyunyan. Harutyunyan appointed Vardanyan Minister of State on 4 November 2022. Vardanyan submitted a request to revoke his Russian citizenship so that he could become a citizen of Artsakh, which was officially granted in December 2022. Vardanyan was dismissed from the position of State Minister on 23 February 2023, having held office for less than four months. Vardanyan’s dismissal was one of the key demands made by Azerbaijan for it to end the blockade of Artsakh. Prior to this, Vardanyan had rejected Azerbaijani demands that he leave the region. Following his dismissal, Vardanyan vowed to continue living and working in Artsakh.

Philanthropy and social entrepreneurship 

Vardanyan through his philanthropic activities has been involved with Pushkin Museum council, Russian National Orchestra and The American Russian Youth Orchestra. He co-founded Moscow School of Management SKOLKOVO and was its president from 2006 to 2011. As of 2019, Vardanyan holds is the vice-chairman at the Skolkovo advisory board. Vardanyan also heads the supervisory board at Skolkovo Institute for Emerging Market Studies (SIEMS). From 2000 till 2016, Vardanyan was a member of the university endowment supervisory board at Russian New Economic School, During 2008-09 he was one of the members of the advisory board. He had previously held served in supervisory boards of Russian Presidential Academy of National Economy and Public Administration (since 2014), MSU Faculty of Economics (2014-2017), international councils at Brazilian Fundação Dom Cabral' (since 2009), Japanese International Christian University (2011-2015), and GuangHua management school in China. 

In 2013 Ruben Vardanyan with Veronika Zonabend and partners established UWC Dilijan College. The college an international boarding school for exceptionally talented youth in Armenian city Dilijan.

In early 2000s Ruben Vardanyan and Noubar Afeyan initiated the Armenia 2020 project. Vardanyan's philanthropic organization IDea Foundation undertakes the Tatev Revival Project that supports the restoration of Tatev Monastery in southern Armenia. Vardanyan has supported other restoration initiatives, such as that of the Saint George's Church in Tbilisi in 2015. Vardanyan was one of the benefactors of the Armenian Cathedral of Moscow, consecrated in 2017.  In May 2017 the restored Holy Mother of God Church was opened Mushkapat, Artsakh. in 2019, the restoration of Yukhari Govhar Agha Mosque in Shushi was supported by Vardanyan's Revival of Oriental Historical Heritage Foundation.

In 2016 the Foundation for Armenian Science and Technology was established jointly by Vardanyan, Noubar Afeyan, Fr. Mesrop Aramian and Artur Alaverdyan. In 2014 Vardanyan also co-funded the prize money of the Aurora Prize for Awakening Humanity jointly with Noubar Afeyan, and Vartan Gregorian.

Personal life 
Vardanyan is married to Veronika Zonabend who is of Jewish origin, but was baptized into the Armenian Apostolic Church. Zonabend is the co-founder of the Armenian UWC Dilijan College. She also holds a post at the American University of Armenia advisory board. Zonabend is the head of the executive board at the Teach For Armenia Educational Foundation. Vardanyan's elder sister Marine Ales is a composer and songwriter, a member of the Aurora Prize Creative Council, and co-founder of "Grant Life Armenia" charity fund.

Awards 
In 1999, Vardanyan was recognized as the Businessman of the Year by American Chamber of Commerce in Russia. For the subsequent couple of years he was named the "best business manager on Russia's capital market" by Career magazine. Ernst & Young recognized Vardanyan as the Entrepreneur of the Year in 2004. The National Association of Stock Market participants declared Vardanyan as the "investment banker of the year" in 2004 during the Stock market elite competition. Russian GQ nominated him as the "Man of the Year" as Best Entrepreneur in the year 2010. In 2001 Fortune magazine included Vardanyan in its list of "25 Rising Stars of the New Generation". The same year, Vardanyan was included in the list of "100 Global Leaders of Tomorrow" at the World Economic Forum.

Vardanyan was awarded the Order of St. Mesrop Mashtots by the President of Armenia in 2011, the Order of Saint Gregory the Illuminator by Armenian Church in 2013, and Order of Friendship by the president of Tatarstan Rustam Minnikhanov in 2018. The same year, Vardanyan received the Academy of International Business Presidential Award for contribution to the development of education, and, with co-founder of the Aurora humanitarian initiative Noubar Afeyan, the Search for Common Ground prize to honor accomplishments in conflict resolution, negotiation, community building, and peace-building.

References

External links 

 Official website

1968 births
Living people
Armenian businesspeople
Russian businesspeople
Russian people of Armenian descent
Moscow State University alumni
People who lost Russian citizenship